Pine Hills may refer to the following places:
In the United States

 Pine Hills, Albany, New York, a neighborhood in Albany, New York
 Pine Hills (Atlanta), a neighborhood in Georgia
 Pine Hills, California, a census-designated place in Humboldt County, California
 Pine Hills, San Diego County, California, another area in California by the same name
 Pine Hills (California), a mountain range in San Diego County, California
 Pine Hills, Florida, a census-designated place in Orange County, Florida
 Pine Hills (Massachusetts), a region in Plymouth, Massachusetts
 Pine Hills, West Virginia, an unincorporated community
 The Pine Hills, a small mountain range in Montana

In Australia
 Pine Hills, Queensland, a locality in the Western Downs Region

See also
 Pine Hill (disambiguation)
 Pinehill (disambiguation)
 Pine Grove Hills